Horace Crotty (9 October 1886 – 16 January 1952) was the Anglican Bishop of Bathurst in Australia from 1928 to 1936.

Crotty was educated at Melbourne Grammar School and the University of Melbourne, where he was a resident at Trinity College. Ordained in 1910 while head teacher of All Saints' Grammar School, Melbourne, he was vicar of Ivanhoe, then rector of St Thomas's, North Sydney, before being a wartime chaplain. When peace returned he was appointed Dean of Newcastle where he served until his consecration to the episcopate. On the resignation of his see he was appointed vicar of St Pancras, London. A noted Freemason, in 1943 he retired to Brighton, England, where he died nine years later.

References 

Newcastle Morning Herald and Miners' Advocate Friday 18 January 1952 page 2

1886 births
1952 deaths
People educated at Melbourne Grammar School
People educated at Trinity College (University of Melbourne)
Anglican bishops of Bathurst
Religious leaders from Melbourne
University of Melbourne alumni
Australian military chaplains
World War I chaplains